PS Bristol Queen was a passenger excursion vessel built for P & A Campbell in 1946.

History

She was built in 1946 by Charles Hill & Sons in Bristol, and launched on 4 April 1946, by the Lady Mayoress of Bristol, Mrs J. Owen, with a bottle of Bristol Cream sherry Her engines were made by Rankin & Blackmore, Greenock, works number 517. R&B also built ’s engine.

She was built as a replacement for P & A Campbell ships lost during the Second World War, and operated pleasure cruises in the Bristol Channel, often to Ilfracombe.

On 20 August 1966, she hit Penarth Pier damaging the pier head.

She was taken out of service after an accident to a paddle wheel on 26 August 1967 and was scrapped the following year.

References

1946 ships
Passenger ships of the United Kingdom
Steamships of the United Kingdom
Paddle steamers of the United Kingdom
Ships built in Bristol